Ye with tilde (Е̃ е̃; italics: Е̃ е̃) is a letter of the Cyrillic script. In all its forms it looks exactly like the Latin letter E with tilde (Ẽ ẽ Ẽ ẽ).

Ye with tilde is used in the Khinalug language where it represents a nasalized close-mid front unrounded vowel or open-mid front unrounded vowel /ẽ~ɛ̃/.

See also
Ẽ ẽ : Latin letter Ẽ
Cyrillic characters in Unicode

References

Cyrillic letters with diacritics
Letters with tilde